The Letter,  previously called The Stare, is a 2012 American psychological thriller film written and directed by Jay Anania, starring Winona Ryder and James Franco. Franco is a former student of Anania's, who teaches directing at NYU. The pair previously collaborated on Shadows and Lies. In 2012, it was announced that Lionsgate purchased the distribution rights to the film, which was retitled The Letter. The film got its first theatrical showing at the Cincinnati Film Festival on September 9, 2012.

Plot
A playwright, Martine (Ryder), suffers from paranoia and hallucinations as she attempts to stage a new production. She is uncertain over whether she is deluded or if there is a plot against her. Tyrone (Franco) is an actor in Martine's new play.

Cast 
Winona Ryder as Martine
James Franco as Tyrone
Dagmara Dominczyk as Elizabeth Mcintyre
Josh Hamilton as Raymond
Katherine Waterston as Julie
Marin Ireland as Anita

Reception 
Writing for 7MPictures, Liam Carr said that "The Letter is not a thriller. It is barely a film. It's a boring, self-important, disjointed and pointless pile of tripe masquerading as a movie."

References

External links
 

2012 films
2012 psychological thriller films
American psychological thriller films
Films set in New York City
Films shot in New York City
2010s English-language films
2010s American films